Lkhagvasürengiin Sosorbaram (born 22 March 2001) is a Mongolian judoka.

She is the silver medallist of the 2019 Judo Grand Slam Düsseldorf in the -52 kg category.

References

External links
 

2001 births
Living people
Mongolian female judoka
Judoka at the 2018 Summer Youth Olympics
Judoka at the 2020 Summer Olympics
Olympic judoka of Mongolia
21st-century Mongolian women